Brisbane Roar Football Club Youth is the youth system of Brisbane Roar Football Club based in Brisbane, Queensland, Australia. The team plays in the National Premier Leagues, the second level of the soccer pyramid in Australia. They play the majority of their home games at AJ Kelly Park, Kippa-Ring.

Brisbane Roar Under-23s, is the second team within the academy, functioning as a reserve team on matchdays.

Players

NPLQ
These are the players that play in the National Premier Leagues Queensland and are also eligible to play with the senior squad.

 (Captain)

Under-23s
These players can play for the NPL/Under-23s and the senior squad.

Staff

History

Brisbane Roar Youth (2008–2019)
The National Youth League team was founded in 2008 as a Brisbane Roar (then Queensland Roar) representative for the inaugural season of the National Youth League competition.

On 1 February 2019, Brisbane Roar Youth were crowned Champions for the first time in the Y-League winning 3–1 over Western Sydney Wanderers U21 with the three goals coming from Shannon Brady, Daniel Leck and Mirza Muratovic.

Brisbane Roar Academy (2015–present)
In January 2014, it was confirmed that the NPL team would compete in the National Premier Leagues Queensland competition for 2014 season onwards.

In January 2017, Brisbane Roar announced their new under-20s team to be played in the National Premier Leagues Queensland U-20.

On 1 February 2019, Brisbane Roar Youth were crowned Champions for the first time in the Y-League winning 3–1 over Western Sydney Wanderers U21 with the three goals coming from Shannon Brady, Daniel Leck and Mirza Muratovic.

Honours
NPLQ Seniors
 Premiership
Runners-up : 2021

Y-League
 Premiership
Winners: 2018–19
Runners-up : 2011–12, 2014–15, 2015–16, 2016–17
 Grand Final
Winners : 2019

NPL Under-20s
 Premiership
 Runners-up : 2019

Under-18s
 Premiership
 Runners-up : 2018

See also
 Brisbane Roar FC
 Brisbane Roar FC (W-League)

References

External links
 Official website

Brisbane Roar FC
National Premier Leagues clubs
Soccer clubs in Brisbane
Association football clubs established in 2008
2008 establishments in Australia
A-League National Youth League